This is a list of mountains of the Swiss canton of Vaud. Vaud is partly mountainous and is one of the nine cantons having summits above 3,000 metres. It is also one of the two cantons (with Bern) extending over both the high Alps and the Jura. Topographically, the three most important summits of the canton are those of the Diablerets (most elevated), the Vanil Noir (most prominent) and Mont Tendre (most isolated).

The first table lists the highest summits of the canton. It includes all summits above 2,800 metres with a topographic prominence of at least . The seconde table only includes significant summits with a topographic prominence of at least , but has no height cut-off. There are over 40 such summits in Vaud and they are mostly found in its westernmost and easternmost districts. All mountain heights and prominences on the list are from the largest-scale maps available.

Highest summits

Main list

References

Vaud